Noam Baumann (born 10 April 1996) is a Swiss professional footballer who plays as a goalkeeper.

Professional career
Baumann begun his senior footballing career with Zug 94, and overcame knee injuries in his first season to become the starting goalie. He transferred to FC Wil ono 11 February 2016. Baumann then joined FC Lugano in the Swiss Super League on a loan with option to buy, on 15 March 2018.

Baumann made his professional debut for Lugano in a 2-1 Swiss Super League win over FC Sion on 22 July 2018.

On 30 July 2022, Baumann joined Saudi Arabian club Abha on a two-year deal. On 6 August 2022, it was announced that the club and the player both agreed to cancel the contract mutually due to Baumann's partner's circumstances.

On 8 September 2022, Baumann signed with Ascoli in Italy until the end of the season, with an option to extend for two more years. On 31 January 2023, Baumann's contract with Ascoli was terminated by mutual consent.

International career
Baumann was born in Switzerland, to a Swiss father from Bern and a Dominican mother. Baumann is a youth international for Switzerland.

Honours
Lugano
Swiss Cup: 2021–22

References

External links
 
 Lugano profile
Noam Baumann en Fútbol Dominicano. Net
 SFL Profile

1996 births
Sportspeople from Lausanne
Living people
Swiss men's footballers
Association football goalkeepers
Switzerland under-21 international footballers
Switzerland youth international footballers
Swiss people of Dominican Republic descent
Sportspeople of Dominican Republic descent
FC Lugano players
FC Wil players
FC Luzern players
Ascoli Calcio 1898 F.C. players
Swiss Super League players
Swiss Challenge League players
Serie B players
Swiss expatriate footballers
Expatriate footballers in Italy
Swiss expatriate sportspeople in Italy